The Hennepin Avenue Bridge is the structure that carries Hennepin County State Aid Highway 52, Hennepin Avenue, across the Mississippi River in Minneapolis, Minnesota, at Nicollet Island. Officially, it is the Father Louis Hennepin Bridge, in honor of the 17th-century explorer Louis Hennepin, who was the first European to see the Saint Anthony Falls, a short distance downriver. Two of the three previous structures have been suspension bridges, while a third—which existed nearly a century—was composed of steel arch spans. The original crossing, which opened as a toll bridge on January 23, 1855, is believed to have been the first permanent span across the Mississippi at any point. Other bridges were completed in 1876, 1891, and most recently 1990.

See also
List of bridges documented by the Historic American Engineering Record in Minnesota
List of crossings of the Upper Mississippi River

References

External links

 of previous bridge

Bridges completed in 1855
Bridges completed in 1876
Bridges completed in 1891
Bridges completed in 1990
Historic American Engineering Record in Minnesota
History of Minneapolis
Bridges in Minneapolis
Bridges over the Mississippi River
Suspension bridges in the United States
Road bridges in Minnesota
1855 establishments in Minnesota Territory
Former toll bridges in Minnesota
Towers in Mississippi
Concrete bridges in the United States
Metal bridges in the United States